Jorn Brondeel (born 7 September 1993) is a Belgian professional footballer who plays as a goalkeeper for Beveren.

References

External links
 
 Career stats & Profile - Voetbal International

1993 births
Living people
People from Wetteren
Association football goalkeepers
Belgian footballers
S.V. Zulte Waregem players
K.S.C. Lokeren Oost-Vlaanderen players
Lierse S.K. players
NAC Breda players
FC Twente players
Willem II (football club) players
Belgian Pro League players
Eredivisie players
Eerste Divisie players
Footballers from East Flanders
S.K. Beveren players